Peter Hamerlík (born 2 January 1982) is a Slovak ice hockey goaltender. He is currently a free agent.

Career
Hamerlík played previously for HK 36 Skalica, Kingston Frontenacs, Cincinnati Cyclones, Providence Bruins, Augusta Lynx, Reading Royals, Trenton Devils and HC Oceláři Třinec. He also played in the 2010 IIHF World Championship as a member of the Slovakia men's national ice hockey team.

Career statistics

International

References

External links 

1982 births
Living people
Augusta Lynx players
AZ Havířov players
Boston Bruins draft picks
Bratislava Capitals players
Cincinnati Cyclones (ECHL) players
HC Dynamo Pardubice players
HC Frýdek-Místek players
HC Oceláři Třinec players
HK 36 Skalica players
HK Poprad players
Kazzinc-Torpedo players
Khimik-SKA Novopolotsk players
Kingston Frontenacs players
Orli Znojmo players
People from Myjava
Sportspeople from the Trenčín Region
Pittsburgh Penguins draft picks
Providence Bruins players
Reading Royals players
Slovak ice hockey goaltenders
Trenton Titans players
Slovak expatriate ice hockey players in the United States
Slovak expatriate ice hockey players in Canada
Slovak expatriate sportspeople in Belarus
Slovak expatriate ice hockey players in the Czech Republic
Slovak expatriate sportspeople in Kazakhstan
Expatriate ice hockey players in Kazakhstan
Expatriate ice hockey players in Belarus